In academic publishing, a sister journal, mirror journal or companion journal is a newer academic journal that is affiliated with an older, better-established journal in the same field.

Examples
JAAD Case Reports is a sister journal to the Journal of the American Academy of Dermatology, both published by Elsevier.
Translational Psychiatry is a sister journal to Molecular Psychiatry.
In 2001, BMJ Publishing Group launched BMJ USA and the Western Journal of Medicine as sister journals to the BMJ.
Science Translational Medicine is a sister journal to Science.
As of 1995, Nature sister journals included Nature Medicine, Nature Structural Biology and Nature Genetics.
Oncogenesis is a sister journal to Oncogene.
Stem Cells Translational Medicine  is a sister journal to the Wiley-Blackwell journal Stem Cells.

References

Academic publishing